Empress Dowager Cixi (formerly romanised as Empress Dowager T'zu-hsi; 29 November 1835 – 15 November 1908), of the Manchu Yehe Nara clan, was a Chinese noblewoman, concubine and later regent who effectively controlled the Chinese government in the late Qing dynasty for 47 years, from 1861 until her death in 1908. Selected as a concubine of the Xianfeng Emperor in her adolescence, she gave birth to a son, Zaichun, in 1856. After the Xianfeng Emperor's death in 1861, the young boy became the Tongzhi Emperor, and she assumed the role of co-empress dowager, alongside the Emperor's widow, Empress Dowager Ci'an. Cixi ousted a group of regents appointed by the late emperor and assumed the regency along with Ci'an, who later died. Cixi then consolidated control over the dynasty when she installed her nephew as the Guangxu Emperor at the death of her son, the Tongzhi Emperor, in 1875. This was contrary to the traditional rules of succession of the Qing dynasty that had ruled China since 1644.

Cixi supervised the Tongzhi Restoration, a series of moderate reforms that helped the regime survive until 1911. Although Cixi refused to adopt Western models of government, she supported technological and military reforms and the Self-Strengthening Movement. She supported the principles of the Hundred Days' Reforms of 1898, but feared that sudden implementation, without bureaucratic support, would be disruptive and that the Japanese and other foreign powers would take advantage of any weakness. She placed the Guangxu Emperor, who, she thought, had tried to assassinate her, under virtual house arrest for supporting radical reformers, publicly executing the main reformers. After the Boxer Rebellion led to invasion by Allied armies, Cixi initially backed the Boxer groups and declared war on the invaders. The ensuing defeat was a stunning humiliation. When Cixi returned to Beijing from Xi'an, where she had taken the emperor, she became friendly to foreigners in the capital and began to implement fiscal and institutional reforms aimed to turn China into a constitutional monarchy. The deaths of both Cixi and the Guangxu Emperor in November 1908 left the court in the hands of Manchu conservatives, a child, Puyi, on the throne, and a restless, deeply divided society.

Historians both in China and abroad have debated her legacy. Conventionally denounced as a ruthless despot whose reactionary policies – although successfully self-serving in prolonging the ailing Qing dynasty – led to its humiliation and utter downfall in the Wuchang Uprising. Revisionists suggested that Nationalist and Communist revolutionaries scapegoated her for deep-rooted problems beyond salvage, and lauded her maintenance of political order. She was responsible for numerous effective, if belated reforms – including the abolition of slavery, ancient torturous punishments and the ancient examination system in her ailing years. The latter was supplanted by institutions including the new Peking University.

Life

Birth
The future Empress Dowager Cixi was born on the tenth day of the tenth lunar month in the 15th year of the rulership of the Daoguang Emperor (29 November 1835). Her father was Huizheng, a member of the Bordered Blue Banner who held the title of a third class duke. Palace archives show that Huizheng was working in Beijing during the year of Lady Yehe Nara's birth, an indication that she was born in Beijing. The file records the location of her childhood home: Pichai Hutong, Xisipailou, Beijing. She had a sister named Wanzhen and a brother named Guixiang.

Xianfeng era

In 1851, Cixi participated in the selection for wives to the Xianfeng Emperor alongside 60 other candidates. Cixi was one of the few candidates chosen to stay. Among the other chosen candidates were Noble Lady Li of the Tatara clan (later Consort Li) and Concubine Zhen of the Niohuru clan (later the Xianfeng Emperor's empress consort). On 26 June 1852, she left her widowed mother's residence at Xilahutong and entered the Forbidden City and was placed in the sixth rank of consorts, styled "Noble Lady Lan".

On 28 February 1854, Cixi was elevated to the fifth rank of consorts and granted the title "Concubine Yi". In 1855, Cixi became pregnant, and on 27 April 1856, she gave birth to Zaichun, the Xianfeng Emperor's first and only surviving son. On the same day, she was elevated to the fourth rank of consorts as "Consort Yi". In 1857, when her son reached his first birthday, Cixi was elevated to the third rank of consorts as "Noble Consort Yi". This rank placed her second only to the Empress Niohuru among the women within the Xianfeng Emperor's harem.

Unlike many of the other Manchu women in the imperial household, Cixi was known for her ability to read and write Chinese. This skill granted her numerous opportunities to help the ailing emperor in the governing of the Chinese state on a daily basis. On various occasions, the Xianfeng Emperor had Cixi read palace memorials for him and leave instructions on the memorials according to his will. As a result, Cixi became well-informed about state affairs and the art of governing from the ailing emperor.

Tongzhi era
In September 1860, during the closing stages of the Second Opium War, the British diplomatic envoy Harry Parkes was arrested along with other hostages, who were tortured and executed. In retaliation, British and French troops under the command of Lord Elgin attacked Beijing, and by the following month they had burned the Old Summer Palace to the ground. The Xianfeng Emperor and his entourage, including Cixi, fled Beijing to Rehe Province (around present-day Chengde, Hebei). On hearing the news of the destruction of the Old Summer Palace, the Xianfeng Emperor, who was already showing signs of dementia, fell into a depression. He turned heavily to alcohol and drugs and became seriously ill. He summoned eight of his most prestigious ministers, headed by Sushun, Zaiyuan and Duanhua, and named them the "Eight Regent Ministers" to direct and support the future emperor. The Xianfeng Emperor died on 22 August 1861 at the Chengde Mountain Resort in Rehe Province.

The Xianfeng Emperor's heir, the son of Noble Consort Yi (Empress Dowager Cixi), was only five years old. It is commonly assumed that on his deathbed, the Xianfeng Emperor summoned his Empress and Noble Consort Yi and gave each of them a stamp. He hoped that when his son ascended the throne, the Empress and Noble Consort Yi would cooperate in harmony and help the young emperor to grow and mature together. This may also have been done as a check on the power of the eight regents. There is no evidence for this incident, however, and it is unlikely that the emperor ever would have intended Noble Consort Yi to wield political power. It is possible that the seal, allegedly given as a symbol for the child, was really just a present for Noble Consort Yi herself. Informal seals numbered in the thousands and were not considered political accoutrements, rather objects of art commissioned for pleasure by emperors to stamp on items such as paintings, or given as presents to the concubines. Upon the death of the Xianfeng Emperor, his Empress was elevated to the status of empress dowager. Although her official title was "Empress Dowager Ci'an", she was popularly known as the "East Empress Dowager" because she lived in the eastern Zhongcui Palace. Noble Consort Yi was also elevated to "Empress Dowager Cixi". She was popularly known as the "West Empress Dowager" (西太后) because she lived inside the western Chuxiu Palace.

Xinyou Coup: Ousting Sushun

By the time of the death of the Xianfeng Emperor, Empress Dowager Cixi had become a shrewd political strategist. In Rehe Province, while waiting for an astrologically favourable time to transport the emperor's coffin back to Beijing, Cixi conspired with court officials and imperial relatives to seize power. Cixi's position as the lower-ranked empress dowager had no intrinsic political power attached to it. In addition, her son, the young emperor, was not a political force himself. As a result, it became necessary for her to ally herself with other powerful figures, including the late emperor's principal wife, Empress Dowager Ci'an. Cixi suggested that they become co-reigning empress dowagers, with powers exceeding the eight regents; the two had long been close friends since Cixi first came to the imperial household.

Tensions grew between the two Empresses Dowager and the eight regents, who were led by Sushun. The regents did not appreciate Cixi's interference in political affairs, and their frequent confrontations with the Empresses Dowager left Empress Dowager Ci'an frustrated. Ci'an often refused to come to court audiences, leaving Cixi to deal with the ministers alone. Secretly, Cixi had begun gathering the support of talented ministers, soldiers, and others who were ostracized by the eight regents for personal or political reasons. Among them was Prince Gong, who had been excluded from power, yet harboured great ambitions, and Prince Chun, the sixth and seventh brothers of the Xianfeng Emperor, respectively. While Cixi aligned herself with the two princes, a memorial came from Shandong asking for her to "rule from behind the curtains" or "listen to politics behind the curtains", i.e., to assume power as de facto ruler. The same memorial also asked Prince Gong to enter the political arena as a principal "aide to the Emperor".

When the Xianfeng Emperor's funeral procession left for Beijing, Cixi took advantage of her alliances with Princes Gong and Chun. She and the boy emperor returned to the capital before the rest of the party, along with Zaiyuan and Duanhua, two of the eight regents, while Sushun was left to accompany the deceased emperor's procession. Cixi's early return to Beijing meant that she had more time to plan with Prince Gong and ensure that the power base of the eight regents was divided between Sushun and his allies, Zaiyuan and Duanhua. In order to remove them from power, history was rewritten: the regents were dismissed for having carried out incompetent negotiations with the "barbarians" that had caused the Xianfeng Emperor to flee to Rehe Province "greatly against his will", among other charges.

To display her high moral standards, Cixi executed only three of the eight regents. Prince Gong had suggested that Sushun and others be executed by the most painful method, known as slow slicing ("death by a thousand cuts"), but Cixi declined the suggestion and ordered that Sushun be beheaded, while the other two also marked for execution, Zaiyuan and Duanhua, were given pieces of white silk for them to hang themselves with. In addition, Cixi refused outright the idea of executing the family members of the regents, as would be done in accordance with imperial tradition of an alleged usurper. Ironically, Qing imperial tradition also dictated that women and princes were never to engage in politics. In breaking with tradition, Cixi became the only empress dowager in the Qing dynasty to assume the role of regent, ruling from behind the curtains.

This coup is historically known as the Xinyou Coup because it took place in the xinyou year, the name of the year 1861 in the Chinese sexagenary cycle.

Ruling behind the curtain

New era
In November 1861, a few days following the Xinyou Coup, Cixi was quick to reward Prince Gong for his help. He was appointed Prince-Regent and his eldest daughter was made a first rank princess, a title usually bestowed only on the Empress's first-born daughter. However, Cixi avoided giving Prince Gong the absolute political power that princes such as Dorgon exercised during the Shunzhi Emperor's reign. As one of the first acts of "ruling behind the curtain" from within the Hall of Mental Cultivation, the political and governmental hub during this era, Cixi, nominally along with Ci'an, issued two imperial edicts on behalf of the boy emperor. The first stated that the two Empresses Dowager were to be the sole decision-makers "without interference," and the second changed the emperor's regnal title from Qixiang ("auspicious") to Tongzhi ("collective stability").

Despite being designated as the sole decision-makers, both Ci'an and Cixi were forced to rely on the Grand Council and a complex series of procedures in order to deal with affairs of state. When state documents came in, they were to be first forwarded to the Empresses Dowager, then referred back to Prince Gong and the Grand Council. Having discussed the matters, Prince Gong and his colleagues would seek the instruction of the Empresses Dowager at audiences and imperial orders would be drawn up accordingly, with drafts having to be approved by the Empresses Dowager before edicts were issued. The most important role of the Empresses Dowager during the regency was to apply their seals to edicts, a merely mechanical role in a complex bureaucracy.

Cleaning up the bureaucracy

Cixi's ascendancy came at a time of internal chaos and foreign challenges. The effects of the Second Opium War were still hovering over the country, and the Taiping Rebellion continued its seemingly unstoppable advance through China's south, eating up the Qing Empire bit by bit. Internally, both the national bureaucracy and regional authorities were infested with corruption. 1861 happened to be the year of official examinations, whereby officials of all levels presented their political reports from the previous three years. Cixi decided that the time was ripe for a bureaucratic overhaul, and she personally sought audience with all officials above the level of provincial governor, who had to report to her personally. Cixi thus took on part of the role usually given to the Bureaucratic Affairs Department (吏部). Cixi had two prominent officials executed to serve as examples for others: Qingying, a military shilang who had tried to bribe his way out of demotion, and He Guiqing, then Viceroy of Liangjiang, who fled Changzhou in the wake of an incoming Taiping army instead of trying to defend the city. A number of reforms were implemented, such as the development of the Zongli Yamen, an official foreign ministry to deal with international affairs, the restoration of regional armies and regional strongmen, modernization of railroads, factories, and arsenals, an increase of industrial and commercial productivity, and the institution of a period of peace that allowed China time to modernize and develop.

Another significant challenge Cixi faced was the increasingly decrepit state of the Manchu elites. Since the beginning of Qing rule over China in 1644, most major positions at court had been held by Manchus. Cixi, again in a reversal of imperial tradition, entrusted the country's most powerful military unit against the Taiping rebels into the hands of a Han Chinese, Zeng Guofan. Additionally, in the next three years, Cixi appointed Han Chinese officials as governors in all southern Chinese provinces, raising alarm bells in the court, traditionally protective of Manchu dominance.

Regarding the reforms of the Tongzhi Restoration, Mary C. Wright suggested that "Not only a dynasty but also a civilization which appeared to have collapsed was revived to last for another sixty years by the extraordinary efforts of extraordinary men in the 1860s." John K. Fairbank wrote, "That the Qing managed to survive both domestic and international attacks is due largely to the policy and leadership changes known as the Qing Restoration."

Taiping victory and Prince Gong

Under the command of Zeng Guofan, the victorious Xiang Army defeated the Taiping rebel army in a hard-fought battle at Tianjing (present-day Nanjing) in July 1864. Zeng was rewarded with the title of "Marquess Yiyong, First Class", while his brother Zeng Guoquan, along with Li Hongzhang, Zuo Zongtang and other Han Chinese officers who fought against the Taiping rebels, were rewarded with auspicious decorations and titles. With the Taiping rebel threat receding, Cixi focused her attention on new internal threats to her power. Of special concern was the position of Prince Gong, who was Prince-Regent in the imperial court. Prince Gong gathered under his command the support of all outstanding Han Chinese armies. In addition, Prince Gong controlled daily court affairs as the head of the Grand Council and the Zongli Yamen (the de facto foreign affairs ministry). With his increasing stature, Prince Gong was considered a threat to Cixi and her power.

Although Prince Gong was rewarded for his conduct and recommendation of Zeng Guofan before the Taiping rebels' defeat, Cixi was quick to move after Cai Shouqi, a minor scribe-official, filed a memorial accusing Prince Gong of corruption and showing disrespect to the emperor. Having built up a powerful base and a network of allies at court, Prince Gong considered the accusations insignificant. Cixi, however, took the memorial as a stepping stone to Prince Gong's removal. In April 1865, under the pretext that Prince Gong had "improper court conduct before the two empresses," among a series of other charges, the prince was dismissed from all his offices and appointments, but was allowed to retain his status as a noble. The dismissal surprised the nobility and court officials and brought about numerous petitions for his return. Prince Gong's brothers, Prince Dun and Prince Chun, both sought their brother's reinstatement. Prince Gong himself, in an audience with the two empresses, burst into tears. Bowing to popular pressure, Cixi allowed Prince Gong to return to his position as the head of the Zongli Yamen, but rid him of his title of Prince-Regent. Prince Gong would never return to political prominence again, and neither would the liberal and pro-reform policies of his time. Prince Gong's demotion revealed Cixi's iron grip on politics, and her lack of willingness to give up absolute power to anyone – not even Prince Gong, her most important ally in the Xinyou Coup.

Foreign influence

China's defeat in the Second Opium War of 1856–60 was a wake-up call. Military strategies were outdated, both on land and sea and in terms of weaponry. Sensing an immediate threat from foreigners and realising that China's agricultural-based economy could not hope to compete with the industrial prowess of the West, Cixi decided that for the first time in Chinese history, China would learn from the Western powers and import their knowledge and technology. At the time, three prominent Han Chinese officials, Zeng Guofan, Li Hongzhang and Zuo Zongtang, had all begun industrial programs in the country's southern regions. In supporting these programmes, Cixi also decreed the opening of the Tongwen Guan in 1862, a school for foreign languages in Beijing. The Tongwen Guan specialised in new-age topics such as astronomy and mathematics, as well as the English, French and Russian languages. Groups of young boys were also sent abroad to the United States for studies.

China's "learn from foreigners" programme quickly met with impediments. The Chinese military institutions were in desperate need of reform. Cixi's solution, under the advice of officials at court, was to purchase seven British warships. When the warships arrived in China, however, they were staffed with British sailors, all under British command. The Chinese were enraged at this "international joke", negotiations broke down between the two parties, and China returned the warships to Britain, where they were to be auctioned off. Scholars sometimes attribute the failure of China's foreign programmes to Cixi's conservative attitude and old methods of thinking, and contend that Cixi would learn only so much from the foreigners, provided it did not infringe upon her own power. Under the pretext that a railway was too loud and would "disturb the emperors' tombs", Cixi forbade its construction. When construction went ahead anyway in 1877 on Li Hongzhang's recommendation, Cixi asked that they be pulled by horse-drawn carts. She also refused to be driven in a motorcar, as the driver would be unable to lower himself in front of her, as custom dictated. Cixi was especially alarmed at the liberal thinking of people who had studied abroad, and saw that it posed a new threat to her power. In 1881, Cixi put a halt to the policy of sending children abroad to study and withdrew her formerly open attitude towards foreigners.

The Tongzhi Emperor's marriage

In 1872, the Tongzhi Emperor turned 17. Under the guidance of the Empress Dowager Ci'an, he was married to the Jiashun Empress. The empress's grandfather, Prince Zheng, was one of the eight regents ousted from power in the Xinyou Coup of 1861. He had been Cixi's rival during the coup and was ordered to commit suicide after Cixi's victory. As a consequence, there were tensions between Cixi and the empress, and this was often a source of irritation for Cixi. Moreover, the empress's zodiac symbol of tiger was perceived as life-threatening by the superstitious Cixi, whose own zodiac symbol was a goat. According to Cixi's belief, it was a warning from the gods that she would eventually fall prey to the empress.

As the principal consort of the Tongzhi Emperor, the Jiashun Empress was well received by both the emperor and Empress Dowager Ci'an. Her personal consultants once warned her to be more agreeable and docile to Cixi, as Cixi was truly the one in power. The empress replied, "I am a principal consort, having been carried through the front gate with pomp and circumstance, as mandated by our ancestors. Empress Dowager Cixi was a concubine, and entered our household through a side gate."

Since the very beginning of his marriage, the Tongzhi Emperor proceeded to spend most of his time with his empress at the expense of his four concubines, including the Imperial Noble Consort Shushen, who was Cixi's preferred candidate for the Tongzhi Emperor's empress consort. As hostility grew between Cixi and the Jiashun Empress, Cixi suggested the couple spend more time on studies and spied on the Tongzhi Emperor using palace eunuchs. After her warning was ignored, Cixi ordered the couple to separate, and the Tongzhi Emperor purportedly spent several months following Cixi's order in isolation at Qianqing Palace.

The young emperor, who could no longer cope with his grief and loneliness, grew more and more ill-tempered. He began to treat his servants with cruelty and punished them physically for minor offences. Under the joined influence of court eunuchs and Zaicheng, Prince Gong's eldest son and the Tongzhi Emperor's best friend, the emperor managed to escape the palace in search of pleasure in the unrestricted parts of Beijing. For several evenings the emperor disguised himself as a commoner and secretly spent the nights in the brothels of Beijing. The emperor's sexual habits became common talk among court officials and commoners, and there are many records of the emperor's escapades.

The Tongzhi Emperor's deficiencies in ruling
The Tongzhi Emperor received a rigorous education from four famous teachers of Cixi's own choosing: Li Hongzao, Qi Junzao, Weng Xincun, and Woren. This group was later joined by Weng Xincun's son, Weng Tonghe; the emperor's governor, also selected by Cixi, was Mianyu. The imperial teachers instructed the emperor in the classics and various old texts for which the emperor displayed little or no interest.

Despite, or perhaps because of, the pressure and stress put upon the young emperor, he despised learning for the majority of his life. According to Weng Tonghe's diary, the emperor could not read a memorandum in full sentences by the age of 16. Worried about her son's inability to learn, Cixi only pressured him more. When he was given personal rule in November 1873 at the age of 18 (four years behind the usual custom), the Tongzhi Emperor proved to be an incompetent ruler.

The Tongzhi Emperor made two important policy decisions during his short stint of rule, which lasted from 1873 to 1875. First, he decreed that the Summer Palace, destroyed by the English and French in the Second Opium War, would be completely rebuilt under the pretext that it was a gift to Cixi and Ci'an. Historians also suggest that it was an attempt to drive Cixi from the Forbidden City so that he could rule without interference in policy or his private affairs.

The imperial treasury was almost depleted at the time from internal strife and foreign wars, and as a result, the Tongzhi Emperor asked the Board of Finance to forage for the necessary funds. In addition, he encouraged members of the nobility and high officials to donate funds from their personal resources. Once construction began, the emperor checked its progress on a monthly basis, and would often spend days away from court, indulging himself in pleasures outside of the Forbidden City.

Uneasy about the Tongzhi Emperor's neglect of national affairs, the emperor's uncles Prince Gong and Prince Chun, along with other senior court officials, submitted a joint memorandum asking the emperor to cease the construction of the Summer Palace, among other recommendations. The Tongzhi Emperor, unwilling to submit to criticism, issued an imperial edict in August 1874 to strip Prince Gong of his princely title and demote him to the status of a commoner. Two days later, Prince Dun, Prince Chun, Prince Fu, Jingshou, Prince Qing, Wenxiang, Baojun, and Grand Councillors Shen Guifen and Li Hongzao were all to be stripped of their respective titles and jobs.

Seeing the mayhem unfold from behind the scenes, Cixi and Ci'an made an unprecedented appearance at court directly criticising the emperor for his wrongful actions and asked him to withdraw the edict; Cixi said that "without Prince Gong, the situation today would not exist for you and me."

Feeling a grand sense of loss at court and unable to assert his authority, the Tongzhi Emperor returned to his former habits. It was rumoured that he caught syphilis and became visibly ill. The physicians spread a rumour that the emperor had smallpox, and proceeded to give medical treatment accordingly. Within a few weeks, on 13 January 1875, the emperor died. The Jiashun Empress followed suit in March. Judging from a modern medical perspective, the onset of syphilis comes in stages, thus the emperor's quick death does not seem to reflect its symptoms. Therefore, most historians maintain that the Tongzhi Emperor did, in fact, die from smallpox. Regardless, by 1875, Cixi was back onto the helm of imperial power.

Guangxu era

New challenges and illness

The Tongzhi Emperor died without a male heir, a circumstance that created an unprecedented succession crisis in the dynastic line. Members of the generation above were considered unfit, as they could not, by definition, be the successor of their nephew. Therefore, the new emperor had to be from a generation below or the same generation as the Tongzhi Emperor. After considerable disagreement between the two Empresses Dowager, Zaitian, the four-year-old firstborn son of Prince Chun and Cixi's sister, was to become the new emperor. 1875 was declared the first year of the Guangxu era; Guangxu was the new emperor's regnal name and it means "glorious succession". Zaitian was taken from home and for the remainder of his life would be cut completely off from his family. While addressing Ci'an conventionally as huang e'niang ("Empress Mother"), Zaitian was forced to address Cixi as qin baba ("Dear Father"), in order to enforce an image that she was the fatherly figure in the household. The Guangxu Emperor began his education when he was aged five, taught by the imperial tutor Weng Tonghe, with whom he would develop a lasting bond.

Shortly after the accession of the Guangxu Emperor, Cixi fell severely ill. This rendered her largely inaccessible to her young nephew and had the result of leaving Ci'an to attend to most of the affairs of state.

The sudden death of Ci'an in April 1881 brought Cixi a new challenge. Ci'an had taken little interest in running state affairs, but was the decision-maker in most family affairs. As the consort of the Xianfeng Emperor, she took seniority over Cixi, despite being two years her junior. Some believe that rumours began circulating at court to the effect that Cixi had poisoned Ci'an, perhaps as a result of a possible conflict between Cixi and Ci'an over the execution of the eunuch An Dehai in 1869 or a possible will from the late Xianfeng Emperor that was issued exclusively to Ci'an. Because of a lack of evidence, however, historians are reluctant to believe that Ci'an was poisoned by Cixi, but instead choose to believe that the cause of death was a sudden stroke, as validated by traditional Chinese medicine.

In the years between 1881 and 1883, Cixi resorted to written communication only with her ministers. The young Guangxu Emperor reportedly was forced to conduct some audiences alone, without Cixi to assist him.

The once fierce and determined Prince Gong, frustrated by Cixi's iron grip on power, did little to question Cixi on state affairs, and supported Manchu involvement in the Sino-French War of 1884–1885. Cixi used China's loss in the war as a pretext for getting rid of Prince Gong and other important decision-makers in the Grand Council in 1885. She downgraded Prince Gong to "advisor" and elevated the more easily influenced Prince Chun.

When it was first developed by Empress Dowager Cixi, the Beiyang Fleet was said to be the strongest navy in East Asia. Before her adopted son, Emperor Guangxu, took over the throne in 1889, Cixi wrote out explicit orders that the navy should continue to develop and expand gradually. However, after Cixi went into retirement, all naval and military development came to a drastic halt. Japan's victories over China has often been falsely rumored to be the fault of Cixi. Many believed that Cixi was the cause of the navy's defeat by embezzling funds from the navy in order to build the Summer Palace in Beijing. The greatest symbol of this enduring belief is the Marble Boat that is part of the Summer Palace. However, extensive research by Chinese historians suggests that Cixi was not the cause of the Chinese navy's decline. In actuality, China's defeat was caused by Emperor Guangxu's lack of interest in developing and maintaining the military. His close adviser, Grand Tutor Weng Tonghe, advised Guangxu to cut all funding to the navy and army, because he did not see Japan as a true threat, and there were several natural disasters during the early 1890s which the emperor thought to be more pressing to expend funds on.

The Guangxu Emperor's accession

The Guangxu Emperor technically gained the right to rule at the age of 16 in 1887 after Cixi issued an edict to arrange a ceremony to mark his accession. Because of her prestige and power, however, court officials voiced their opposition to the Guangxu Emperor's personal rule, citing the emperor's youth as the main reason. Prince Chun and Weng Tonghe, each with a different motive, requested that the Guangxu Emperor's accession be postponed until a later date. Cixi, with her reputed reluctance, accepted the "advice" and legitimised her continued rule through a new legal document that allowed her to "aid" the Guangxu Emperor in his rule indefinitely.

The Guangxu Emperor slowly began to take on more responsibilities in spite of Cixi's prolonged regency. In 1886, he attended his first field plowing ceremony and began commenting on imperial state documents. By 1887, he began to rule under Cixi's supervision.

The Guangxu Emperor married and took up the reins of power in 1889. By that year, the emperor was already 18, older than the conventional marriage age for emperors. Prior to his wedding, a large fire engulfed the Gate of Supreme Harmony at the Forbidden City. This event followed a trend of recent natural disasters that were considered alarming by many observers. According to traditional Chinese political theory, such incidents were taken as a warning of the imminent loss of the "Mandate of Heaven" by current rulers.

For his empress, Empress Dowager Cixi chose the Guangxu Emperor's cousin Jingfen, who would become Empress Longyu. Besides her close relation to the emperor himself, she was also Cixi's niece. Cixi in addition selected two concubines for the Guangxu Emperor who were sisters, Consorts Jin and Zhen. The Guangxu Emperor eventually would prefer to spend more time with Consort Zhen, neglecting his Empress, much to Cixi's dismay. In 1894, Cixi degraded Consort Zhen, citing intervention in political affairs as the main reason. According to some reports, she even had her flogged. Consort Jin had also been implicated in Consort Zhen's reported influence peddling and also apparently suffered a similar punishment. A cousin of theirs, Zhirui, was banished from the capital to a military outpost.

"Retirement"
On 5 March 1889, Cixi retired from her second regency, but nonetheless served as the effective head of the imperial family. Many officials felt and showed more loyalty to the empress dowager than they did to the emperor, owing in part to her seniority and in part to her personalised approach to cultivating court favourites, many of whom would be given gifts of her artwork and invitations to join her at the theater for opera and acrobatics.

In spite of her residence for a period of time at the Summer Palace, which had been constructed with the official intention of providing her a suitable place to live after retiring from political affairs, Cixi continued to influence the decisions and actions of the Guangxu Emperor even after he began his formal rule at age 19. Along with an entourage of court officials, the Guangxu Emperor would pay visits to her every second or third day at which major political decisions would be made. Weng Tonghe observed that while the emperor dealt with day-to-day administration, the Grand Councillors gave their advice in more complex cases, and in the most complex cases of all, the advice of Cixi was sought.

In 1894, the First Sino-Japanese War broke out over Korea whose age-old allegiance to Beijing was wavering. After the decisive victory and ensuing Treaty of Shimonoseki, Japan annexed Taiwan from Qing China. During this period, Cixi was continuously called upon to arbitrate policy-making, and the emperor was sometimes even bypassed in decision-making processes. Cixi eventually was given copies of the secret palace memorials as well, a practice that was carried on until 1898, when it became unnecessary.

In November 1894, Cixi celebrated her 60th birthday. Borrowing from the plans used for the celebrations of the 70th and 80th birthdays of Empress Xiaoshengxian (the Qianlong Emperor's mother), plans included a triumphal progress along the decorated road between the Forbidden City and the Summer Palace, decorations for the Beijing city gates and monumental archways, free theatrical performances, remission of punishments and the restoration of degraded officials. However, the war between China and Japan forced the empress dowager to cancel the lavish celebrations she had planned and settle for a much smaller commemoration that was held in the Forbidden City.

Hundred Days' Reform

After coming to the throne, the Guangxu Emperor became more reform-minded. After a humiliating defeat in the First Sino-Japanese War of 1894, during which the Chinese Beiyang Fleet was virtually destroyed by the Imperial Japanese Navy, the Qing government faced unprecedented challenges internally and abroad, with its very existence at stake. Under the influence of reformist-officials Kang Youwei and Liang Qichao, the Guangxu Emperor believed that by learning from constitutional monarchies such as Japan and Germany, China would become politically and economically powerful. In June 1898, the Guangxu Emperor launched the Hundred Days' Reform aimed at sweeping political, legal and social changes and issued edicts for far-reaching modernising reforms.

These abrupt reforms, however, came without building support either at court or in the bureaucracy. Cixi, whether concerned that they would check her power or fearful that they would lead to disorder, stepped in to prevent them from going further. Some government and military officials warned Cixi that the ming-shi (reformation bureau) had been geared toward conspiracy. Allegations of treason against the emperor, as well as suspected Japanese influence within the reform movement, led Cixi to resume the role of regent and resume control at the court. The Manchu general Ronglu on 21 September 1898, took the Emperor to Ocean Terrace, a small palace on an island in the middle of Zhongnanhai linked to the rest of the Forbidden City only by a controlled causeway. Cixi followed this action with an edict that proclaimed the Guangxu Emperor's total disgrace and unfitness to be emperor. The Guangxu Emperor's reign effectively came to an end.

According to research by Professor Lei Chia-sheng (雷家聖), during the Hundred Days' Reform, former Japanese Prime Minister Itō Hirobumi arrived in China on 11 September 1898. Almost at the same time, British missionary Timothy Richard was invited to Beijing by the reformist Kang Youwei. Richard suggested that China should hand over some political power to Itō in order to help push the reforms further. On 18 September, Richard convinced Kang to adopt a plan by which China would join a federation composed of China, Japan, the United States, and England. This suggestion did not reflect the policies of the countries concerned. It was Richard's (and perhaps Itō's) trick to convince China to hand over national rights. Kang nonetheless asked fellow reformers Yang Shenxiu (楊深秀) and Song Bolu (宋伯魯) to report this plan to the Guangxu Emperor. On 20 September, Yang sent a memorial to this effect to the emperor. In another memorial written the next day, Song Bolu also advocated the formation of a federation and the sharing of the diplomatic, fiscal, and military powers of the four countries under a hundred-man committee.

Still according to Lei's findings, on 13 October, British ambassador Claude MacDonald reported to his government about the Chinese situation, saying that Chinese reforms had been damaged by Kang Youwei and his friends' actions. British diplomat Frederick Bourne claimed in his own report that Kang was a dreamer who had been seduced by Timothy Richard's sweet words. Bourne thought Richard was a plotter. The British and U.S. governments were unaware of the "federation" plot, which seems to have been Richard's personal idea. Because Richard's partner Itō Hirobumi had been Prime Minister of Japan, the Japanese government might have known about Richard's plan, but there is no evidence to this effect.

A crisis over the issue of abdication emerged. Bowing to increasing pressure from the West and general civil discontent, Cixi did not forcibly remove the Guangxu Emperor from the throne, although she attempted to have Pujun, a boy of 14 who was from a close branch of the imperial family, installed as crown prince. The Guangxu era nominally continued until his death in 1908, but the emperor lost all respect, power, and privileges, including his freedom of movement. Most of his supporters, including his political mentor Kang Youwei, fled into exile, and the six prominent reformers including Tan Sitong and Kang's younger brother, were publicly beheaded. Kang continued to work for a constitutional monarchy while in exile, remaining loyal to the Guangxu Emperor and hoping eventually to restore him to power. His efforts would prove to be in vain.

Boxer Rebellion

In 1900, the Boxer Rebellion broke out in northern China. Perhaps fearing further foreign intervention, Cixi threw her support to these anti-foreign bands by making an official announcement of her support for the movement and a formal declaration of war on the Western powers. The general Ronglu deliberately sabotaged the performance of the imperial army during the rebellion. Dong Fuxiang's Muslim troops (the "Kansu Braves") were able and eager to destroy the foreign military forces in the legations, but Ronglu stopped them from doing so. The Manchu prince Zaiyi was xenophobic and friendly with Dong Fuxiang. Zaiyi wanted artillery for Dong's troops to destroy the legations. Ronglu blocked the transfer of artillery to Zaiyi and Dong, preventing them from destroying the legations. When artillery was finally supplied to the imperial army and Boxers, it was only done so in limited amounts; Ronglu deliberately held back the rest of them. The Chinese forces defeated the small 2,000-man Western relief force at the Battle of Langfang, but lost several decisive battles, including the Battle of Beicang, and the entire imperial court was forced to retreat as the forces of the Eight-Nation Alliance invaded Beijing. Due to the fact that moderates at the Qing imperial court tried to appease the foreigners by moving the Muslim Kansu Braves out of their way, the allied army was able to march into Beijing and seize the capital.

During the war, Cixi displayed concern about China's situation and foreign aggression, saying, "Perhaps their magic is not to be relied upon; but can we not rely on the hearts and minds of the people? Today China is extremely weak. We have only the people's hearts and minds to depend upon. If we cast them aside and lose the people's hearts, what can we use to sustain the country?" The Chinese people were almost unanimous in their support for the Boxers due to the Western Allied invasion.

When Cixi received an ultimatum demanding that China surrender total control over all its military and financial affairs to foreigners, she defiantly stated before the Grand Council, "Now they [the Powers] have started the aggression, and the extinction of our nation is imminent. If we just fold our arms and yield to them, I would have no face to see our ancestors after death. If we must perish, why not fight to the death?" It was at this point that Cixi began to blockade the legations with the armies of the Beijing Field Force, which began the siege.

Cixi stated that "I have always been of the opinion, that the allied armies had been permitted to escape too easily in 1860. Only a united effort was then necessary to have given China the victory. Today, at last, the opportunity for revenge has come", and said that millions of Chinese would join the cause of fighting the foreigners since the Manchus had provided "great benefits" to China.

During the Battle of Beijing, the entire imperial court, including Empress Dowager Cixi and the Guangxu Emperor, fled Beijing and evacuated to Xi'an as the allied forces invaded the city. After the fall of Beijing, the Eight-Nation Alliance negotiated a treaty with the Qing government, sending messengers to the empress dowager in Xi'an. Included in the terms of the agreement was a guarantee that China would not have to give up any further territories to foreign powers. Many of Cixi's advisers in the imperial court insisted that the war against the foreigners be continued. They recommended that Dong Fuxiang be given responsibility to continue the war effort. Cixi was practical, however, and decided that the terms were generous enough for her to acquiesce and stop the war, at least after she was assured of her continued reign when the war was concluded. The Western powers needed a government strong enough to suppress further anti-foreign movements, but too weak to act on its own; they supported the continuation of the Qing dynasty, rather than allowing it to be overthrown. Cixi turned once more to Li Hongzhang to negotiate. Li agreed to sign the Boxer Protocol, which stipulated the presence of an international military force in Beijing and the payment of £67 million (almost $333 million) in war reparations. The United States used its share of the war indemnity to fund the creation of China's prestigious Tsinghua University. The Guangxu Emperor and Cixi did not return to Beijing from Xi'an until roughly 18 months after their flight.

Return to Beijing and reforms

In January 1902, Cixi, the Guangxu Emperor, the empress and the rest of the court made a ceremonious return to Beijing. At the railhead at Chengtingfu, Cixi and the court boarded a 21-car train to convey them the rest of the way to the capital. In Beijing, many of the legation women turned out to watch the procession from the Beijing railway station to the Forbidden City, and for the first time, commoners were permitted to watch as well.

Once back in the palace, Cixi implemented sweeping political reforms. High officials were dispatched to Japan and Europe to gather facts and draw up plans for sweeping administrative reforms in law, education, government structure, and social policy, many of which were modeled on the reforms of the Meiji Restoration. The abolition of the examination system in 1905 was only the most visible of these sweeping reforms. Ironically, Cixi sponsored the implementation of the New Policies, a reform program more radical than the one proposed by the reformers she had beheaded in 1898.

In an attempt to woo foreigners, Cixi also invited the wives of the diplomatic corps to a tea in the Forbidden City soon after her return, and in time, would hold summer garden parties for the foreign community at the Summer Palace. In 1903, she acquiesced to the request of Sarah Conger, wife of Edwin H. Conger, the U.S. Ambassador to China, to have her portrait painted by American artist Katharine Carl for the St. Louis World's Fair. Between 1903 and 1905, Cixi had a Western-educated lady-in-waiting by the name of Yu Deling, along with her sister and mother, serve at her court. Yu Deling, fluent in English and French, as well as Chinese, often served as translator at meetings with the wives of the diplomatic corps.

In 1903, Cixi allowed a young aristocratic photographer named Yu Xunling, a brother of Yu Deling, to take elaborately staged shots of her and her court. They were designed to convey imperial authority, aesthetic refinement, and religious piety. As the only photographic series taken of Cixi – the supreme leader of China for more than 45 years – it represents a unique convergence of Qing court pictorial traditions, modern photographic techniques, and Western standards of artistic portraiture. The rare glass plates have been blown up into full-size images, included in the exhibition "The Empress Dowager" at the Arthur M. Sackler Gallery, Smithsonian Institution, Washington, D.C.

Xuantong era

Empress Dowager Cixi died in the Hall of Graceful Bird at the Middle Sea of Zhongnanhai, Beijing, on 15 November 1908, after having installed Puyi as the new emperor on 14 November 1908. Her death came only a day after the death of the Guangxu Emperor. Radicals greeted the news with scorn. The anarchist Wu Zhihui, who had leveled some of the most vitriol at Cixi in life, wrote from exile in Paris of the "vixen empress and vermin emperor" that "their lingering stench makes me vomit."

On 4 November 2008, forensic tests concluded that the Guangxu Emperor died from acute arsenic poisoning. China Daily quoted a historian, Dai Yi, who speculated that Cixi may have known of her imminent death and may have worried that the Guangxu Emperor would continue his reforms after her death. It was reported in November 2008 that the level of arsenic in his remains was 2,000 times higher than that of ordinary people.

Empress Dowager Ci'an lies in the Puxiangyu Eastern Ding Mausoleum (lit. "Tomb East of the Ding Mausoleum in the Broad Valley of Good Omen"), while Empress Dowager Cixi built herself the much larger Putuoyu Eastern Ding Mausoleum (lit. "Tomb East of the Ding Mausoleum in the Putuo Valley"). The Ding Mausoleum (lit. "Tomb of Quietude"), where the Xianfeng Emperor is buried, is located west of the Dingdongling. The Putuo Valley owes its name to Mount Putuo, one of the Four Sacred Buddhist Mountains of China.

Empress Dowager Cixi, unsatisfied with her tomb, ordered its destruction and reconstruction in 1895. The new tomb was a complex of temples, gates, and pavilions, covered with gold leaf, and with gold and gilded-bronze ornaments hanging from the beams and the eaves. In July 1928, Cixi's tomb was plundered by the warlord Sun Dianying and his army as part of the looting of the Eastern Mausoleum. They methodically stripped the complex of its precious ornaments, then dynamited the entrance to the burial chamber, opened Cixi's coffin, threw her corpse (said to have been found intact) on the ground, and stole the jewels contained in the coffin. They also took the massive pearl that had been placed in the empress dowager's mouth to protect her corpse from decomposing (in accordance with Chinese tradition). Sun Dianying claimed the desecration was revenge for the death of his ancestor Sun Chengzong in 1638. Puyi had his grandmother's remains reburied. After 1949, the complex of Empress Dowager Cixi's tomb was restored by the Chinese government.

Legacy

For many years, the mainstream view of Empress Dowager Cixi was that she was a devious despot who contributed in no small part to China's slide into corruption, anarchy, and revolution. Cixi used her power to accumulate vast quantities of money, bullion, antiques and jewelry, using the revenues of the state as her own. The long-time China journalist Jasper Becker recalled that "every visitor to the Summer Palace is shown the beautiful lakeside pavilion in the shape of an elegant marble pleasure boat and told how Cixi spent funds destined for the imperial navy on such extravagant fripperies—which ultimately led to Japan's victory over China in 1895 and the loss of Taiwan".

Yet even after the violent anti-foreign Boxer movement and equally violent foreign reprisal, the initial foreign accounts of Cixi emphasized her warmth and friendliness.

This was perhaps because Cixi took the initiative and invited several women to spend time with her in the Forbidden City. Katharine Carl, an American painter, was called to China in 1903 to paint Cixi's portrait for the St. Louis Exposition. In her With the Empress Dowager, Carl portrays Cixi as a kind and considerate woman for her station. Cixi, though shrewd, had great presence, charm, and graceful movements resulting in "an unusually attractive personality". Carl wrote of the empress dowager's love of dogs and of flowers, as well as boating, Chinese opera and her Chinese water pipes and European cigarettes. Cixi also commissioned the well-known portraitist Hubert Vos to produce a series of oil portraits.

The publication of China Under The Empress Dowager (1910) by J. O. P. Bland and Edmund Backhouse contributed to Cixi's reputation with its back-door gossip, much of which came from palace eunuchs. Their portrait included contradictory elements, writes one recent study, "on the one hand... imperious, manipulative, and lascivious" and on the other "ingenuous, politically shrewd, and conscientious..." Backhouse and Bland told their readers that "to summarize her essence simply, she a woman and an Oriental". Backhouse was later found to have forged some of the source materials used in this work. The vivid writing and lascivious details of their account provided material for many of the books over the following decades, including Chinese fiction and histories that drew on a 1914 translation.

In the People's Republic after 1949, the image of the Manchu Empress was debated and changed several times. She was sometimes praised for her anti-imperialist role in the Boxer Uprising and sometimes she was reviled as a member of the "feudalist regime". When Mao Zedong's wife, Jiang Qing was arrested in 1976 for abuse of power, an exhibit at the Palace Museum put Cixi's luxurious goods on display to show that a female ruler weakened the nation.

By the mid-1970s, views among scholars began to change. Sue Fawn Chung's doctoral dissertation at University of California, Berkeley, was the first study in English to use court documents rather than popular histories and hearsay. Despite this, writers such as Jung Chang have criticized this narrative and have written works such as Chang's Empress Dowager Cixi: The Concubine Who Launched Modern China in order to offer an opposing view.

Several widely read popular biographies appeared. Sterling Seagrave's Dragon Lady: The Life and Legend of the Last Empress of China portrays Cixi as a woman stuck between the xenophobic faction of Manchu nobility and more moderate influences.

In 2013, Jung Chang's biography, Empress Dowager Cixi: The Concubine Who Launched Modern China, portrays Cixi as the most capable ruler and administrator that China could have had at the time. Pamela Kyle Crossley said in the London Review of Books that Chang's claims "seem to be minted from her own musings, and have little to do with what we know was actually going in China". Although Crossley was sympathetic to restoring women's place in Chinese history, she found "rewriting Cixi as Catherine the Great or Margaret Thatcher is a poor bargain: the gain of an illusory icon at the expense of historical sense".

Titles and honours

Titles
 During the reign of the Daoguang Emperor (r. 1820–1850):
 Lady Yehe Nara (from 29 November 1835)
 During the reign of the Xianfeng Emperor (r. 1850–1861):
 Noble Lady Lan (from 26 June 1852), sixth rank consort
 Concubine Yi (from 28 February 1854), fifth rank consort
 Consort Yi (from 27 April 1856), fourth rank consort
 Noble Consort Yi (from January/February 1857), third rank consort
 During the reign of the Tongzhi Emperor (r. 1861–1875):
 Imperial Noble Consort Dowager Yi (from 22 August 1861)
 Empress Dowager Cixi (from 23 August 1861)
 During the reign of the Xuantong Emperor (r. 1908–1912):
 Grand Empress Dowager Cixi (from 14 November 1908)
 Empress Xiaoqinxian (from 16 November 1909)

Honours
  Dame Grand Cordon of the Order of the Precious Crown (Empire of Japan).
  Dame Grand Cross of the Order of Saint Catherine (Russian Empire, 28 May 1897)

Family
 Father: Yehenara Huizheng (1805–1853)
 Paternal grandfather: Jingrui
 Paternal grandmother: Lady Gūwalgiya
 Mother: Lady Fuca
 Maternal grandfather: Huixian
 Three younger brothers
 Second younger brother: Guixiang (1849–1913), served as first rank military official, and held the title of a third class duke, the father of Empress Xiao Ding Jing (1868–1913)
 One younger sister
 Second younger sister: Wanzhen (1841–1896), the mother of the Guangxu Emperor (1871–1908)

Issue
 As Concubine Yi:
 Zaichun (27 April 1856 – 12 January 1875), the Xianfeng Emperor's first son, enthroned on 11 November 1861 as the Tongzhi Emperor

In fiction and popular culture
 Cixi (first called 'Orchid', later 'Tzu Hsi') and her favourite eunuch are the main characters in the historical novel Lotus Blossom published in 1939 by George Lancing (pseudonym of the British author Matilda Angela Antonia Hunter).
 Flora Robson portrays the empress 'Tzu Hsi' in the 1963 Nicholas Ray's American epic historical film 55 Days at Peking; this film (based on a book by Noel Gerson) dramatizes the siege of the foreign legations' compounds in Peking during the Boxer Rebellion.
 Der Ling's story The True Story of the Empress Dowager (originally published as Old Buddha) gives a portrayal of the history behind the character of the Empress-Dowager Cixi—not as the monster of depravity depicted in the popular press, but an aging woman who loved beautiful things and had many regrets about the past. (Soul Care Publishing, 2015)
 Pearl S. Buck's novel Imperial Woman chronicles the life of the Empress Dowager from the time of her selection as a concubine until near to her death.
 Bette Bao Lord's novel Spring Moon starts in the days of Cixi, and includes the involvement of the Imperial Court in the Boxer Rebellion.
 The novels Empress Orchid (2004) and The Last Empress (2007), by Anchee Min portray the life of Empress Dowager Cixi from a first-person perspective.
 The Noble Consort Yi is featured in George McDonald Fraser's novel, Flashman and the Dragon (1985).
 The 1968 novel Wij Tz'e Hsi Keizerin Van China ("We, Tz'e Hsi, Empress of China") by Dutch author Johan Fabricius is a fictional diary of the Empress.
 In the 1970s, she was portrayed by Lisa Lu in two Hong Kong-made films, The Empress Dowager (set during the Sino-Japanese War), and its sequel, The Last Tempest (set during the "Hundred Days of Reform"). 
 Lu reprised her role as Cixi in the 1987 film The Last Emperor, depicting the dowager on her deathbed.
 In the 1980s, she was portrayed by Liu Xiaoqing, in Burning of Imperial Palace (depicting her rise to power in the 1850s, and the burning of the Old Summer Palace by French and British troops in 1860), in Reign Behind a Curtain  (depicting the Xinyou Coup of 1861), in The Empress Dowager (set during the latter part of the reign of Tongzhi), and in Li Lianying, the Imperial Eunuch.
 In the Lover of the Last Empress, she was portrayed by Chingmy Yau.
 The China Central Television production Towards the Republic portrayed Empress Dowager Cixi as a capable ruler, the first time that Mainland Chinese television had shown her in this light. The portrayal was not entirely positive, as it also clearly depicted her political views as very conservative.
 She is portrayed in the novel The Ginger Tree, by Oswald Wynd (1977).
 The novel The Pleiades, by Japanese author Jirō Asada, focuses on Empress Cixi's relationship with a court eunuch named Chun'er, and depicted Cixi as a ruthless and calculating leader. It was adapted into a 2010 Japanese television series that was also broadcast in China, and starred Japanese actress Yūko Tanaka as Empress Cixi.
 Cixi is a major character in the novel Mandarin, by American author Robert Elegant. The novel is set in the 1850s through the 1870s.
 Earth Queen Hou-Ting in The Legend of Korra is clearly based upon Cixi and the state of the Earth Kingdom during her reign mirrors the decline of Imperial China in the late 19th century.
 Portrayed by Michelle Yim in The Rise and Fall of Qing Dynasty (1990) and The Confidant (2012)
 Portrayed by Susanna Au-yeung in The Rise and Fall of Qing Dynasty (1992)
 Portrayed by Lü Zhong in Princess Der Ling (2006)
 Portrayed by Law Lan in The Last Healer in Forbidden City (2016)
 Portrayed by Xi Meijuan in Nothing Gold Can Stay (2017)
Empress Cixi is the primary antagonist and recurring character, though only ever named as "the Empress Dowager" in the 1991 animated show The Twins of Destiny by French writer/producer Jean Chalopin.
Portrayed as the primary antagonist of the WEBTOON Phantom Paradise.
Mentioned in cultural context by Lee in Chapter 24 of the novel East of Eden by author John Steinbeck.

See also

 Ranks of Imperial Consorts in China#Qing
 Qing Dynasty nobility
 Imperial Decree of declaration of war against foreign powers
 Imperial Decree on events leading to the signing of Boxer Protocol
 Wu Zetian
 Kösem Sultan

Notes

Sources
  Long the standard source until the so-called "Diary of Ching Shan" was exposed as a forgery and Backhouse as a "fraudster". Free online Googlebook here.
 

 
  Draws from the author's never published doctoral dissertation at University of California, Berkeley.
  Free access copy here.
 
 
 
  Popular biography using English language sources.

Further reading

 
 Lei Chia-sheng 雷家聖 (2004). Liwan kuanglan: Wuxu zhengbian xintan 力挽狂瀾：戊戌政變新探 [Containing the furious waves: a new view of the 1898 coup]. Taipei: Wanjuan lou 萬卷樓. .
  Draws from the author's never published doctoral dissertation at University of California, Berkeley.
 
 
  Online resource.
 
 Zhang, Zhan. "Cixi and Modernization of China." Asian Social Science 6.4 (2010): 154+.

External links

 Cixi, Empress Dowager of China, 1835-1908, Photographs, Freer Gallery of Art and Arthur M. Sackler Gallery Archives, Smithsonian Institution, Washington DC.
 Cixi (Character) IMDb List of films in which she is a character.
 Jone Johnson Lewis,Empress Cixi About.com Women's History.
 Cixi – Biography of Dowager Empress of China Cixi or Tz'u-hsi at womenshistory.about.com
 Isaac Taylor Headland, Court Life in China: The Capital, Its Officials and People, (New York, F.H. Revell, c1909). 
 Amanda Bensen, "Cixi: The Woman Behind the Throne", Smithsonian.com (1 March 2008). Describes the rethinking of Cixi, with further links.

1835 births
1908 deaths
Chinese grand empresses dowager
Qing dynasty empresses dowager
Women leaders of China
Consorts of the Xianfeng Emperor
Qing dynasty regents
Chinese people of the Boxer Rebellion
Manchu people
Qing dynasty politicians from Beijing
Grand Cordons of the Order of the Precious Crown
19th-century Chinese people
20th-century Chinese people
19th-century viceregal rulers
19th-century women rulers
20th-century Chinese heads of government
20th-century women rulers
19th-century rulers in Asia
20th-century rulers in Asia